SAB Volley is an Italian women's volleyball club based in Legnano and currently playing in the Serie A1.

Previous names
Due to sponsorship, the club have competed under the following names:
 SAB Grima Irge (2015–2016)
 SAB Grima Legnano (2016–2017)
 SAB Volley Legnano (2017–present)

History
The club was based in Gallarate when founded in 2015 and played in group A of the Serie B1 in 2015–16. Ahead of the 2016–17 season, it acquired Neruda Volley licence to play the Serie A2. The club moved its base to Legnano and renew a contract to continue to play at the PalaBorsani for three seasons. The club finished its first Serie A2 season (in 2016–17) as third place during the regular season, qualifying for the Serie A1 promotion playoffs, reaching the final. Despite missing the promotion, the club submitted its participation for the following season at Serie A2 with a request to be on a waiting list for the Serie A1. On 16 July 2017, the Serie A League confirmed that SAB Volley would participate in the Serie A1 2017–18 season.

Team
Season 2017–2018, as of September 2017.

References

External links
 Official website 

Italian women's volleyball clubs
Volleyball clubs established in 2015
2015 establishments in Italy
Legnano
Sport in Lombardy
Serie A1 (women's volleyball) clubs